Francisc is the Romanian-language form of Francis. In other cases Francisc is the Romanianized form of the Hungarian name Ferenc. 

Notable people with the name include:

Francisc Hossu-Longin
Francisc Rainer
Francisc Șirato, Romanian painter and graphic artist
Francisc Vaștag, Romanian boxer

Romanian masculine given names